The Fuji Stakes (Japanese 富士ステークス) is a Grade 2 horse race for Thoroughbreds aged three and over, run in October over a distance of 1600 metres at Tokyo Racecourse.

It was first run in 1984 and held Grade 3 status from 1998 until 2019. The race was run over 1800 metres until 1996, and over 1400 metres from 1997 to 1999. It serves as a trial race for the Mile Championship.

Winners since 2000

Earlier winners

 1986 - Waverley Star
 1987 - Triptych
 1988 - Salem Drive
 1989 - Oracle Asuka
 1990 - Mogami Champion
 1991 - Stabilizer
 1992 - Shinko Lovely
 1993 - Matikanetannhauser
 1994 - Sakura Chitose O
 1995 - Fujiyama Kenzan
 1996 - Shinko King
 1997 - Biko Alpha
 1998 - Air Jihad
 1999 - Red Chili Pepper

See also
 Horse racing in Japan
 List of Japanese flat horse races

References

Turf races in Japan